Stadionul Comunal is a multi-purpose stadium in Becicherecu Mic, Romania. It is currently used mostly for football matches and is the home ground of Fortuna Becicherecu Mic, respectively Fortuna Becicherecu Mic (women). The stadium was opened in the early 2000s, has a capacity of 900 people (700 on seats) and in the past was the home ground of another local team, Nuova Mama Mia.

References

External links
Stadionul Comunal (Becicherecu Mic) at soccerway.com
Stadionul Comunal (Becicherecu Mic) at europlan-online.de

Football venues in Romania
Sport in Timiș County
Buildings and structures in Timiș County